The Wrong Couples  (Chinese: 不是冤家不聚頭;  pinyin: Bat si yuen ga bat jui tau) is a 1987 Hong Kong comedy film directed by David Chiang Da Wei starring Josephine Siao as May Wong and Richard Ng Yiu Hon as Yu Tai Dai. Josephine Siao won the Best Actress Award at the 7th Hong Kong Film Awards.

Plot
Yu (Richard Ng), a sailor,  returns home and is shock to discover that not only his wife left him, but the house has also been sub-letted to an old maid, May Wong (Josephine Siu). Both Yu and Wong both having own strange habits, and having them living together under the same roof causes numerous hilarious situations.

Cast

Nomination and awards
Josphine Siao was nominated as the Best Actress in the 7th Hong Kong Film Award and won the Best Actress Title.

Release
The Wrong Couples was released in June 1987 and was shown just before summer school holidays in Hong Kong. It grossed HK $8,969,422.00

References

External links
 

1987 films
Hong Kong comedy films
1987 comedy films
Films directed by David Chiang
1980s Hong Kong films